Ivone De Franceschi (born January 1, 1974 in Padua) is an Italian former football player. De Franceschi played as a midfielder and enjoyed a number of spells playing for his hometown club.  He also played for clubs such as ChievoVerona, Venezia, Sporting Clube de Portugal, Bari and Padova.

In June 2007, he announced his retirement because of health problems caused by a heart malformation. He currently serves as Yuri Korablin's assistant at Lega Pro side Venezia.

History
 Padova (2005–2007) (Serie C1)
 Chievo Verona (2004)  (Serie A)
 Bari (2004) (Serie B)
 Chievo Verona (2002–2004)  (Serie A)
 Venezia (2001–2002)  (Serie A)
 Salernitana (2000–2001) (Serie B)
 Venezia (2000–2001) (Serie B)
 Sporting Clube de Portugal (1999–2000)
 Venezia (1998–1999) (Serie A)
 Padova (1996–1998) (Serie B)
 Rimini (1995–1996) (Serie C2)
 Sandonà (1994–1995) (Serie C2)
 Padova (1992–1994) (Serie B)

References

1974 births
Living people
Italian footballers
Italian expatriate footballers
Calcio Padova players
Rimini F.C. 1912 players
Venezia F.C. players
Sporting CP footballers
U.S. Salernitana 1919 players
A.C. ChievoVerona players
S.S.C. Bari players
Serie A players
Serie B players
Primeira Liga players
Expatriate footballers in Portugal
Italian expatriate sportspeople in Portugal
Association football midfielders
Sportspeople from Padua
Footballers from Veneto